The 2022 State Council of the Udmurt Republic election took place on 9–11 September 2022, on common election day, coinciding with the head election. All 60 seats in the State Council were up for reelection.

Electoral system
Under current election laws, the State Council is elected for a term of five years, with parallel voting. 20 seats are elected by party-list proportional representation with a 5% electoral threshold, with the other half elected in 40 single-member constituencies by first-past-the-post voting. Until 2022 the number of mandates allocated in proportional and majoritarian parts were standing at 30 each. Seats in the proportional part are allocated using the Imperiali quota, modified to ensure that every party list, which passes the threshold, receives at least one mandate.

Candidates

Party lists
To register regional lists of candidates, parties need to collect 0.5% of signatures of all registered voters in Udmurtia.

The following parties were relieved from the necessity to collect signatures:
United Russia
Communist Party of the Russian Federation
A Just Russia — Patriots — For Truth
Liberal Democratic Party of Russia
New People
Rodina
Patriots of Russia
Russian Party of Pensioners for Social Justice
Green Alternative

New People, RPPSS and Green Alternative will take part in Udmurtia legislative election for the first time.

Single-mandate constituencies
40 single-mandate constituencies were formed in Udmurtia, an increase of 10 seats since last redistricting in 2017.

To register candidates in single-mandate constituencies need to collect 3% of signatures of registered voters in the constituency.

Polls

Results

|- style="background-color:#E9E9E9;text-align:center;"
! rowspan=2 colspan=2| Party
! colspan=5| Party list
! colspan=2| Constituency
! colspan=2| Total
|-
! width="75"| Votes
! %
! ±pp
! Seats
! +/–
! Seats
! +/–
! Seats
! +/–
|-
| style="background-color:;"|
| style="text-align:left;"| United Russia
| 237,064
| 51.07
|  12.09%
| 13
|  10
| 36
|  12
| 49
|  2
|-
| style="background-color:;"|
| style="text-align:left;"| Communist Party
| 72,212
| 15.56
|  0.70%
| 3
|  1
| 0
|  1
| 3
|  2
|-
| style="background-color:;"|
| style="text-align:left;"| Liberal Democratic Party
| 63,319
| 13.64
|  4.69%
| 3
|  1
| 1
|  1
| 4
|  2
|-
| style="background-color:;"|
| style="text-align:left;"| A Just Russia — For Truth
| 28,120
| 6.06
|  0.51%
| 1
|  0
| 1
|  0
| 2
|  0
|-
| colspan="11" style="background-color:#E9E9E9;"|
|-
| style="background-color:;"|
| style="text-align:left;"| Party of Pensioners
| 21,703
| 4.68
| New
| 0
| New
| 0
| New
| 0
| New
|-
| style="background-color:;"|
| style="text-align:left;"| New People
| 19,217
| 4.14
| New
| 0
| New
| 0
| New
| 0
| New
|-
| style="background-color:;"|
| style="text-align:left;"| Green Alternative
| 5,426
| 1.17
| New
| 0
| New
| 0
| New
| 0
| New
|-
| style="background-color:;"|
| style="text-align:left;"| Rodina
| 3,174
| 0.68
|  1.26%
| 0
| 
| 1
|  1
| 1
|  1
|-
| style="background-color:;"|
| style="text-align:left;"| Independents
| —
| —
| —
| —
| —
| 1
|  3
| 1
|  3
|-
| style="text-align:left;" colspan="2"| Invalid ballots
| 13,919
| 3.00
|  0.09%
| —
| —
| —
| —
| —
| —
|- style="font-weight:bold"
| style="text-align:left;" colspan="2"| Total
| 464,257
| 100.00
| —
| 20
|  10
| 40
|  10
| 60
| 
|-
| colspan="11" style="background-color:#E9E9E9;"|
|-
| style="text-align:left;" colspan="2"| Turnout
| 464,257
| 39.79
|  5.25%
| —
| —
| —
| —
| —
| —
|-
| style="text-align:left;" colspan="2"| Registered voters
| 1,166,741
| 100.00
| —
| —
| —
| —
| —
| —
| —
|-
| colspan="11" style="background-color:#E9E9E9;"|
|- style="font-weight:bold"
| colspan="10" |Source:
|
|}

Incumbent Senator Yury Fyodorov (United Russia) was re-appointed to the Federation Council.

See also
2022 Russian regional elections

References

Udmurtia
Politics of Udmurtia
Regional legislative elections in Russia